Anette Hoff (born 16 May 1961) is a Norwegian actress. She has played hotel manager Juni Anker-Hansen in Hotel Cæsar since 1998. In autumn 2005, spring 2010 and autumn 2011 she took breaks to play on stage. During the 2010 break, she left the show in April 2010 (on TV) and returned in December 2010.
Hoff is as of 2020 the longest serving television soap opera actor in Norway.

Selected filmography

References

External links

1961 births
Living people
Norwegian film actresses
Norwegian television actresses
Norwegian soap opera actresses